"LA Today" is a song by producer and DJ Alex Gold of Xtravaganza Records and singer/songwriter Philip Oakey. It was created and released by Xtravaganza principally for the UK dance and DJ market, but managed to reach number 68 on the UK Singles Chart in April 2003.

The song features Oakey's distinctive baritone vocals over his and Gold's pounding analogue bassline. It was recorded at the Human League Studios owned by Oakey in Sheffield.

Maxi CD track listing
   "L.A. Today" (7" Radio Edit) (3:34) 
   "L.A. Today" (Greed Is Good Mix) (7:46) 
   "L.A. Dreaming" (Instrumental Mix) (8:23)

References

External links

2003 songs
2003 singles
Philip Oakey songs
Songs written by Philip Oakey
English electronic songs